The Refugee Paralympic Team, previously the Independent Paralympic Athletes Team, competed at the 2020 Summer Paralympics in Tokyo, Japan, from 24 August to 5 September 2021. The team consisted of six refugee and asylee Paralympic athletes who represent the estimated 82 million refugees in the world. The formation of the team and its six athletes was announced on 30 June 2021 in a joint statement by the IPC and UNHCR. The team had made its debut at the previous edition of the Paralympics that consisted of just two athletes. That team was considered coordinated and was referred to as "the first". The team was the first to enter the Japan National Stadium during the Parade of Nations at the opening ceremony.

Representation
The team do not represent any particular country; they represent the estimated 82 million people around the world who are refugees. The UNHCR estimates that 12 million of the 82 million refugees have disabilities. The team was welcomed by the UN High Commissioner for Refugees Filippo Grandi.

Participation 
The team was announced on 30 June 2021 by the International Paralympic Committee. American swimmer Ileana Rodriguez was chosen to lead the Refugee Paralympic Team as the chef de mission. Rodriguez was supposed to have the honour of carrying the flag in the opening ceremony's parade of nations but it was actually carried by Karimi and Issa. Rodriguez noted that it was appropriate that refugees should be represented at the Paralympics as they had been founded by Ludwig Guttmann who was himself a refugee.

All athletes are new to the Paralympics except Ibrahim Al Hussein and Shahrad Nasajpour who competed in 2016.

Number of competitors by event
The following lists the number of competitors by event and gender.

Athletics

Paracanoeing

Swimming

Taekwondo

Sponsorship
The team is supported by the IPC organizationally, but financially they are sponsored by AirBNB. AirBNB cover the costs of the team and this allows the athletes to concentrate on their training. AirBNB have a new department to support the team and they run an on-line forum where the athletes talk about their lives. ASICS are supplying the team's outfits as this adds to their sense of identity. This is particularly important as each of them cannot use the flags of the nation where they were born. UNHCR also assist and one of the team's athletes, Abbas Karimi, has been made a UNHCR "High-Profile Supporter".

References 

Refugees
Nations at the 2020 Summer Paralympics
Independent Paralympians at the Paralympic Games